The Little Wild Girl is a 1928 American drama film directed by Frank S. Mattison and featuring Boris Karloff. Prints of this film are held at UCLA Film & TV and the Library of Congress.

Cast
 Lila Lee as Marie Cleste
 Cullen Landis as Jules Barbier
 Frank Merrill as Tavish McBride
 Sheldon Lewis as Wanakee
 Boris Karloff as Maurice Kent
 Jimmy Aubrey as Posty McKnuffle
 Bud Shaw as Oliver Hampton
 Arthur Hotaling as Duncan Cleste

See also
 Boris Karloff filmography

References

External links

AllMovie.com

1928 films
1928 drama films
Silent American drama films
American silent feature films
American black-and-white films
Films set in Canada
Films directed by Frank S. Mattison
1920s American films